Jacobaea incana, the grey ragwort, is a species of Jacobaea in the family Asteraceae.

Description
This perennial herbaceous plant has a short stem and basal leaves arranged in a rosette. They are silver-gray green, thin, spatulate to broadly ovate, pinnate and hairy. They bloom from June to August.

Distribution
This species is widespread in the Eastern Alps to the Apennines and the Carpathians.

Habitat

References

Sandro Pignatti, Flora d'Italia. Vol.  3, Bologna, Edagricole, 1982, pag. 127
F.Conti, G. Abbate, A.Alessandrini, C.Blasi, An annotated checklist of the Italian Vascular Flora, Roma, Palombi Editore, 2005, pag. 164
Christoper Brickell - RHS A-Z Encyclopedia of Garden Plants. Third edition. Dorling Kindersley, London 2003
NCBI

External links
Luirig.altervista
Tela Botanica
Hortipedia

incana
Plants described in 1753
Taxa named by Carl Linnaeus